Ghada Chreim Ata, born 30 September 1968, is a Lebanese female politician and professor of French literature at the Lebanese University.

She was minister for refugees in the government of Hassan Diab between January 2020 and September 2021

Family, studies and work 
Ghada Chreim was born on 30 September 1968 to a Greek-Catholic family in Zahlé, Lebanon. Daughter of a poet and the writer Youssef Chreim, she began her academic studies at the Lebanese University.

Chreim obtained a doctorate in French literature in 2000. She is professor of French literature at the Université libanaise and worked in the faculty of Letters and Human Sciences (section IV) from 2013 to 2016. At the same time, she worked as supervising editor for the magazine Fairuz à Dar As-Sayyad.

Ghada Chreim began working for the participation of women in politics after seeing a Facebook page relating to human rights and social justice.

Political career 
Considered close to President Michel Aoun and his Free Patriotic Party, Aoun named her minister for refugees in the government of Hassan Diab on 21 January 2020. During her time in office, Chreim expressed hopes that the country could eventually close the Ministry of Refugees and Displaced People and replace it with a Ministry for Rural Development to help better address the issues facing displaced people (who largely live in rural areas). When Prime Minister Diab's government resigned in August 2020 following the 2020 Beirut explosion, Chreim and other cabinet ministers stayed on in a caretaker capacity until a new government was formed.

References

External links 
 Who's who in Lebanon's new government Al Arabiya, 22 January 2020
 New Lebanese Government Formed after 3 Months of Political Vacuum Naharnet, 22 January 2020
 Ghada Chreim Ata Women In Front, 20 July 2017 (in French)
 Lebanon breaks regional record with women government officials the961, 22 January 2020

1968 births
Living people
21st-century Lebanese women politicians
21st-century Lebanese politicians
Women government ministers of Lebanon
Free Patriotic Movement politicians
Academic staff of Lebanese University
People from Zahle